Santé Bar is an LGBT-friendly bar in Portland, Oregon.

Description
Santé Bar is an LGBT-friendly bar along the North Park Blocks in northwest Portland's Pearl District. The business is owned by Veronique Lafont, a queer Black woman. Eater Portland Brooke Jackson-Glidden said the bar is "known for its highballs and pretty cocktails served in coupes, ideal for a sunny day".

In a 2021 overview of the city's "wildest" gay bars, she and Conner Reed described Santé as a "narrow, elegant space" with "solid" drinks, and the website's Alex Frane called the bar "cozy and low-key" in his list of "essential Portland cocktail bars where you can sip something exceptional". In 2020, he described Santé as an LGBTQ bar with "elegant" cocktails.

In his 2019 overview of the city's "best in LGBTQ+ nightlife, bars, parties, comedy, and more", the Portland Mercury Andrew Jankowski described Santé as a piano bar "serving cocktails, live jazz, TV musical viewing parties, and open mics with everything from storytelling and poetry to live, music".

History
In 2021, Santé Bar hosted a beer garden during My People's Market.

Reception
In 2019, Willamette Week said, "This swanky cocktail bar might not look like much from the outside, but its vintage vibe, romantic lighting and fancy drinks are a welcome shift from the standard westside LGBTQ bar experience." Kara Stokes and Maya MacEvoy included Cooperativa in Eater Portland 2022 overview of "Where to Eat and Drink in Portland’s Pearl District".

See also
 List of Black-owned restaurants

References

External links

Santé Bar at Twitter

Black-owned restaurants in the United States
LGBT culture in Portland, Oregon
LGBT drinking establishments in Oregon
Pearl District, Portland, Oregon
Restaurants in Portland, Oregon